Outlets of Mississippi is an outdoor outlet mall located just north of the intersection of U.S. Route 49 and Interstate 20 in Pearl, Mississippi, United States, approximately 3.5 miles east of Downtown Jackson. More than 30,000 people attended the grand opening of the mall in late November 2013. The mall is anchored by Forever 21. The mall boasts 76 stores, and is one of the state's largest shopping malls.

See also
Northpark Mall (Mississippi)
Metrocenter Mall (Jackson, Mississippi)
 Tanger Outlets Southaven

References

External links
Official website

Shopping malls in Mississippi
Shopping malls established in 2013
Buildings and structures in Rankin County, Mississippi
Tourist attractions in Rankin County, Mississippi